This is a list of newspapers in Vietnam.
Báo Ảnh Việt Nam
Báo Biên phòng
Báo điện tử Đảng Cộng sản Việt Nam
Báo Tin tức
Bất động sản Việt Nam
Cảnh sát nhân dân
Công lý
Công nghiệp Quốc phòng và Kinh tế
Công an nhân dân
Công thương
Đầu tư
Người đưa tin Pháp luật
Hải quân Việt Nam

Le Courrier du Vietnam
Chính trị và Phát triển
Đại biểu Nhân dân
Người lao động
Nhân Dân
Pháp luật Việt Nam
Phòng không – Không quân
Quân đội nhân dân
Quốc phòng Thủ đô
Quốc phòng toàn dân
Sài Gòn Giải Phóng
Tạp chí Cộng sản
Tạp chí Văn hiến Việt Nam
Thanh Niên
Thời báo Tài chính Việt Nam
Thời đại
Tiền Phong
Tiếng nói Việt Nam
Tuổi Trẻ
Văn nghệ Quân đội
Y học Quân sự

Below is a list of websites published in Vietnam in alphabetical order.
24h.com.vn
Báo Mới
Báo Điện tử Chính phủ nước Cộng hòa Xã hội chủ nghĩa Việt Nam
Việt Báo
VietNamNet
Việt Nam News
VnExpress

See also
 Media of Vietnam
 List of newspapers
 List of non-English-language newspapers in New South Wales#Vietnamese

References

Vietnam
Newspapers